Premonition is the fifth studio album by guitarist Tony MacAlpine, released in 1994 through Shrapnel Records.

Critical reception

Robert Taylor at AllMusic calls Premonition "very monotonous with less than memorable melodies and little variety in [MacAlpine's] guitar sound" and "A slightly better than average release in a tired genre." He nonetheless praised MacAlpine's fast guitar work and the "excellent" contributions of drummer Deen Castronovo, but remarked that "the predictable song structures limit the possibilities of the music."

Track listing

Personnel
Tony MacAlpine – guitar, keyboard (except tracks 2, 10), production
Jens Johansson – keyboard (tracks 2, 10)
Deen Castronovo – drums
Tony Franklin – bass
Steve Fontano – engineering
Shawn Morris – engineering
Joe Marquez – engineering
Arjan MacNamara – engineering, mastering
Mark "Mooka" Rennick – overdubbing, mixing, mastering
Mike Varney – executive production

References

External links
In Review: Tony MacAlpine "Premonition" at Guitar Nine Records

Tony MacAlpine albums
1994 albums
Shrapnel Records albums
Albums produced by Mike Varney